Asian Wrestling Championships is the Wrestling Asian Championship organized by the Asian Associated Wrestling Committee (AAWC).

The men's tournament began in 1979 and The women's tournament was first staged in 1996, and it has been held every year.

Competitions

Team titles

All-time medal table
All-time medal count, as of the 2022 Asian Wrestling Championships.

References

External links 
 UWW Database

 
Wrestling
Wrestling competitions
Recurring sporting events established in 1979